Dunnamore, formerly spelt Donamore, is a village and townland in County Tyrone, Northern Ireland.

A neolithic/bronze age wedge tomb, Dunnamore wedge tomb (:de:Wedge Tomb von Dunnamore), known colloquially as "Dermot and Grania's Bed", is located about two miles from the village centre.

Dunnamore is near the main A505 road between Omagh and Cookstown. It is in the Mid Ulster District Council area (and before 2015 was under Cookstown District Council).

References

Villages in County Tyrone